John Archibald MacNaughton (7 October 1896 – 6 June 1944) was a Canadian soldier.

Biography 
Born on 7 October 1896 in Black River Bridge, New Brunswick, MacNaughton enlisted to fight in the First World War, serving in France and Belgium. On his return to Canada he married Grace Helen, with whom he had two children. He was a farmer and taught Sunday School. In the Second World War he re-enlisted and served as a major with the North Shore Regiment. Because of his advanced age he was 43, and the maximum age for enlistment at the time was 45 – he was offered a retirement or reassignment, but opted to lead his company in Operation Overlord. He was killed in Tailleville and buried in the Beny-sur-Mer Canadian War Cemetery. He is believed to have been the oldest Canadian killed on D-Day.

Legacy 
In 2019 MacNaughton became the subject of a Heritage Minute.

References

External links
Canadian Virtual War Memorial
Heritage Minute

1896 births
1944 deaths
Canadian Expeditionary Force soldiers
Canadian Army personnel of World War II
Canadian Militia officers
Canadian military personnel killed in World War II
People from Northumberland County, New Brunswick
Canadian military personnel from New Brunswick
Canadian military personnel of World War I
North Shore (New Brunswick) Regiment